Kibabii University  is a public university in Kenya located in Bungoma County along Bungoma-Chwele highway. Previously a constituent college of Masinde Muliro University of Science and Technology, the university was granted its Charter by President Kenyatta in November 2015. It offers, among other programs, the Bachelor of Commerce.

The Vice Chancellor of Kibabii University is Prof. Isaac Ipara Odeo.

Academics 
Kibabii University  offers academic programmes at the undergraduate and graduate levels through three schools and two faculties.

The schools and faculties are:

 School of Graduate Studies ;
 School of Computing and Informatics (SCAI);
 School of Business & Economics (SOBE);
 Faculty of Education & Social Science (FESS);
 Faculty of Science (FS);

References

External links
Kibabii University website

Kibabii University
Bungoma County
Educational institutions established in 2010
2010 establishments in Kenya